Ice is a large private yacht, measuring  in length. Launched in 2005 as Air, she was completed at the Lürssen yard in Bremen, Germany to the design of Tim Heywood. The yacht was owned by Russian billionaire Suleyman Kerimov from christening until 2015 when Teodoro Nguema Obiang Mangue of Equatorial Guinea acquired the yacht.

The ship has a crew of 27 and is equipped with a diesel-electric powered, using eight 842 kW Deutz 16-cylinder generators to provide electric power to two ABB type 5 Azipod electric azimuth thrusters. She can reach a speed of 18 knots, and has a range of 6000 nautical miles. Ice has a large swimming pool on the main deck (stern) in addition to the jacuzzi on the sun deck. On the third deck, the yacht carries an AgustaWestland AW169 call sign P4-ICE, which can transport ten passengers.

Although its home port is Gibraltar, it was moored at Tangier, Morocco, since November 2016  and spotted in February 2020 at Bridgetown, Barbados and  Port of Spain, Trinidad and Tobago, and later in March 2020 off the coast of Five Islands, Antigua.

History
Ordered by Augusto Perfetti, the keel for Air, also known then as Project Rainbow, was laid down at the Lürssen yard in Bremen, Germany, following the design of Tim Heywood with the interior design by Terence Disdale, but, during construction and prior to delivery, Air was purchased by Suleiman Kerimov and was subsequently renamed Ice at its christening in 2005.

In 2015, Kerimov sold Ice which was worth $150 million (over €130 million) to Dara Limited for use by Teodoro Nguema Obiang Mangue who operates the yacht through his personal assistant Switzerland's Cédric B.'s Marshall Islands based company KOA Asset Management Ltd.

Awards
Ice won Superyacht of the Year at the 2006 World Superyacht Awards.

See also
List of motor yachts by length

Notes

References

External links
 Article on Ice's design concept and interior

2005 ships
Motor yachts
Ships built in Bremen (state)